Below are the squads for the 2013 South Asian Football Federation Cup, hosted by Nepal, which took place between 31 August and 11 September 2013. The player's total caps, their club teams and age are given below.

Group A

Nepal
Coach:  Jack Stefanowski

Bangladesh
Coach:  Lodewijk de Kruif

India
Coach:  Wim Koevermans

Pakistan
Coach:  Shahzad Anwar

Group B

Afghanistan
Coach:  Mohammad Yousef Kargar

Maldives
Coach:  István Urbányi

Sri Lanka
Coach:  Claudio Roberto

Bhutan
Coach:  Kazunori Ohara

References

Squads
SAFF Championship squads